PlayStation Productions, LLC is an American production company owned by Sony Interactive Entertainment.

History 
Sony Interactive Entertainment launched PlayStation Productions in 2019 with a focus on adapting the company's video game franchises into films and television shows. An emphasis was placed on coordination between the film and television departments at Sony Pictures with the video game development studios at PlayStation Studios.

In December 2020, Tony Vinciquerra, Chairman and CEO of Sony Pictures, revealed that Sony was working on three movies and seven TV shows based on PlayStation video game content.

PlayStation Productions first produced film was Uncharted, based on the action-adventure video game franchise by Naughty Dog, released theatrically on February 18, 2022. Gran Turismo, based on the racing simulation video game series by Polyphony Digital, is currently in production and is scheduled to be released theatrically on August 11, 2023. Feature film adaptations of the Sucker Punch Productions video game Ghost of Tsushima, Bend Studio's Days Gone and Japan Studio's Gravity Rush are currently in the works.

In February 2022, a Jak and Daxter film adaptation was revealed to be in development with Uncharted director Ruben Fleischer collaborating on the film with Naughty Dog.

The first television series from PlayStation Productions was an adaptation of Naughty Dog's The Last of Us, which aired on HBO from January 15, 2023, to March 12, 2023. Later in January 2023, HBO announced that the series had been renewed for a second season. Twisted Metal, a television adaptation of the vehicular combat franchise, is currently in post-production for release on Peacock in 2023. Live-action television series based on Santa Monica Studio's God of War franchise for Amazon Prime Video and Guerrilla Games' Horizon series for Netflix, are in the works.

List of productions

Films

Television series

Reception

Box office performance

Critical and public response

Films

Television series

See also 
 Heavenly Sword
 Ratchet & Clank
 PlayStation Network
 PlayStation Video

References 

Sony Interactive Entertainment
Sony Pictures Entertainment
American subsidiaries of foreign companies
Sony subsidiaries
American film studios
Companies based in Culver City, California
Television studios in the United States
American companies established in 2019
Film production companies of the United States